Amanita flavella is a species of mycorrhizal fungus from family Amanitaceae that can be found in New South Wales and Queensland Australia. They can also be yellowish-orange coloured and have crowded gills that are pale yellow in colour. It is slightly bulbous, and is enclosed into a volva. The ring is flared and white coloured. The ring is ample, membranous, and yellowish in colour. The spores are 8.5–10 μm long and 6–6.5 μm wide, and are white coloured, amyloid and ellipsoid. The species is similar in appearance to Amanita flavoconia and Amanita flavipes.

See also

List of Amanita species

References

flavella
Fungi described in 1941
Fungi of Australia
Poisonous fungi
Taxa named by John Burton Cleland